Madina Fozilova (born 1 May 1996) is a Tajikistani footballer who plays as a forward. She has been a member of the Tajikistan women's national team.

International goals

References

1996 births
Living people
Tajikistani women's footballers
Women's association football forwards
Tajikistan women's international footballers